Palak paneer is an Indian dish consisting of paneer (a type of cheese) in a thick paste made from puréed spinach, called palak in Hindi, Marathi, Gujarati, and other Indian languages.

The terms palak paneer and saag paneer are sometimes used interchangeably in restaurants in the Anglosphere. However, saag paneer is different from traditional palak paneer in that it contains other green leafy vegetables, such as mustard greens, whereas palak paneer only contains spinach. Dhaba restaurants often specialize in palak paneer.

Preparation 
Palak paneer is prepared by first boiling and pureeing spinach. The puree is then mixed with sautéed tomatoes and onions. Grilled cubes of paneer are then added to the puree. Palak paneer is typically spiced with ginger, garlic, tomatoes, garam masala, turmeric, chili powder and cumin.

Serving

Palak paneer is served hot with a side such as roti, naan, parathas, makki di roti, or boiled rice. It can also be served with onions on the side for a more traditional approach.

In recent years, there have been fusion variations of palak paneer. In July 2020, a Bangalore-based food blogger posted her variation of palak paneer idli. The dish sparked conversation on Twitter and Instagram about the unusual combination of these two North and South Indian dishes. In September 2020, Vietnam-based Pizza 4P's created unique fusion pizzas in honor of the International Day of Peace. One of these variations was a palak paneer-chapli kebab pizza to symbolize peace between India and Pakistan.

See also
 Saag paneer
Sarson ka saag

References

Indian cheese dishes
Indian curries
North Indian cuisine
Pakistani curries
Punjabi cuisine
Uttar Pradeshi cuisine
Vegetarian dishes of India
Spinach dishes